Fox Retro was an Italian television channel owned by Fox International Channels Italy. It feature older American television series from the 1970s, 1980s and 1990s. It was available with a Sky Italia subscription. It was shut down on 31 December 2014.

Programming

All in the Family
Alice 
Arsène Lupin
Batman
Baywatch
Beverly Hills, 90210
Cagney & Lacey
Charles in Charge
Charlie's Angels
CHiPs
Columbo
Diff'rent Strokes
Eight Is Enough
Ellery Queen
Family Affair
Family Matters
Family Ties
Get Smart
Gimme a Break!
Growing Pains
Happy Days
Hawaii Five-O
I Dream of Jeannie
Knight Rider
Lou Grant
MacGyver
Magnum, P.I.
Man from Atlantis
Miami Vice
Mission: Impossible
Mission: Impossible (1988 TV series)
Moonlighting
Mork & Mindy
Perry Mason
Police Woman
Quincy, M.E.
Remington Steele
Rosie
Scarecrow and Mrs. King
Space: 1999
Star Trek
Starsky & Hutch
T. J. Hooker
The A-Team
The Alfred Hitchcock Hour
The Dukes of Hazzard
The Facts of Life
The Fresh Prince of Bel-Air
The Golden Girls
The Incredible Hulk
The Jeffersons
The Love Boat
The Lucy Show
The Mary Tyler Moore Show
The Nanny
The Odd Couple
The Persuaders!
The Streets of San Francisco
Three's Company
UFO
Wonder Woman
The Simpsons(season 1-11)

References

External links
 

Fox Networks Group
Defunct television channels in Italy
Italian-language television stations
Television channels and stations established in 2009
Television channels and stations disestablished in 2014
2009 establishments in Italy
2014 disestablishments in Italy